Gaetano Assanto from Roma Tre University, Rome, Italy was named Fellow of the Institute of Electrical and Electronics Engineers (IEEE) in 2013 for contributions to nonlinear optical guides and spatial solitons.

References

Fellow Members of the IEEE
Living people
Year of birth missing (living people)
Place of birth missing (living people)
Academic staff of Roma Tre University